Fatehpur is a community development block that forms an administrative division in the Jamtara Sadar subdivision of the Jamtara district, Jharkhand state, India. It is located 27 km from Jamtara, the district headquarters.

Geography

Jamtara district in the south-eastern part of Santhal Parganas is a rolling upland tract. The Barakar separates it from the Chota Nagpur plateau and the Ajay, flows in from Deoghar district in the west, drains the district, forms the border between Jharkhand and West Bengal for some distance and flows into West Bengal in the east.

Fatehpur CD block is bounded by Sarath and Palojori CD blocks in Deoghar district and Masalia CD block in Dumka district on the north, Kundhit on the east, Nala CD block on the south and Jamtara CD block on the west.

Fatehpur CD block has an area of 280.44 km2.Fatehpur and Bindapathar police stations serve this block. Headquarters of this CD block is at Fatehpur village.

Fatehpur CD block has 15 panchayats and 179 villages.

Panchayats of Fatehpur CD block are: Agaiyasarmundi, Asanberia, Bamandiha, Bandarnacha, Banudih, Bindapathar, Chapuriya, Dhasaniya, Dumaria, Fatehpur, Jamjori, Khamarbad, Palajori, Simaldubi and Simladangal.

Demographics

Population
As per the 2011 Census of India Fatehpur CD block had a total population of 89,645, all of which were rural. There were 45,546 (51%) males and 44,099 (49%) females. Population below 6 years was 14,008. Scheduled Castes numbered 6,920 (7.72%) and Scheduled Tribes numbered 42,090 (46.95%).

Large village (with 4,000+ population) in Fatehpur CD block is (2011 census figure in brackets): Fatehpur (4,107).

Literacy
 census, the total number of literates in Fatehpur CD Block was 49,661 (65.66% of the population over 6 years) out of which 30,381 (61%) were males and 19,280 (39%) were females. The gender disparity (the difference between female and male literacy rates) was 22%.

See also – List of Jharkhand districts ranked by literacy rate

Language and religion
In 2001, the present-day Jamtara district was a part of Dumka district. In 2001, Santali was the mother-tongue of 660,233 persons in Dumka district, forming 41.17% of the population, followed by Hindi with 615,667 persons (38.39%) and Bengali with 327,714 persons (20.44%). (percentages have been re-calculated on the basis of data provided in the Census Handbook).

Hindi is the official language in Jharkhand and Urdu has been declared as an additional official language.

In 2011, Hindus numbered 550,560, forming 69.60% of the population of Jamtara district followed by Muslims with 164,406 persons (20.78%) and Christians with 4,419 persons (0.96%).

Rural poverty
60-70% of the population of Jamtara district were in the BPL category in 2004–2005, being in the same category as Ranchi and Dumka districts. Rural poverty in Jharkhand declined from 66% in 1993–94 to 46% in 2004–05. In 2011, it has come down to 39.1%.

Economy

Livelihood

In Fatehpur CD block in 2011, amongst the class of total workers, cultivators numbered 22,309 and formed 50.06%, agricultural labourers numbered 15,349 and formed 34.44%, household industry workers numbered 1,663 and formed 3.73% and other workers numbered 5,242 and formed 11.76%.  Total workers numbered 44,563 and formed 49.71% of the total population. Non-workers numbered 45,082 and formed  50.29% of total population.

Note: In the census records a person is considered a cultivator, if the person is engaged in cultivation/ supervision of land owned. When a person who works on another person's land for wages in cash or kind or share, is regarded as an agricultural labourer. Household industry is defined as an industry conducted by one or more members of the family within the household or village, and one that does not qualify for registration as a factory under the Factories Act. Other workers are persons engaged in some economic activity other than cultivators, agricultural labourers and household workers.  It includes factory, mining, plantation, transport and office workers, those engaged in business and commerce, teachers and entertainment artistes.

Infrastructure
There are 168 inhabited villages in Fatehpur CD block. In 2011, 116 villages had power supply. 48 villages had tap water (treated/ untreated), 162 villages had well water (covered/ uncovered), 165 villages had hand pumps, and all villages had drinking water facility. 15 villages had post offices, 9 villages had sub post offices, 2 villages had telephones (land lines), 9 villages had public call offices and 115 villages had mobile phone coverage. 168 villages had pucca (paved) village roads, 25 villages had bus service (public/ private), 1 village had railway station, 2 villages had autos/ modified autos, and 50 villages had tractors. 10 villages had bank branches, 43 villages had agricultural credit societies, 2 villages had cinema/ video halls, 5 villages had public library and public reading rooms. 62 villages had public distribution system, 19 villages had weekly haat (market) and 88 villages had assembly polling stations.

Backward Regions Grant Fund
Jamtara district is listed as a backward region and receives financial support from the Backward Regions Grant Fund.  The fund created by the Government of India is designed to redress regional imbalances in development. As of 2012, 272 districts across the country were listed under this scheme. The list includes 21 districts of Jharkhand.

Transportation
Chittaranjan railway station on the Howrah-Delhi main line is 18 km from Fatehpur. The Ajay forms the border between Jamtara district of Jharkhand and Bardhaman district of West Bengal. There is a narrow bridge for use by pedestrians and two wheelers, across the Ajay near Chittaranjan (Simjuri).

Education
Fatehpur CD block had 37 villages with pre-primary schools, 168 villages with primary schools, 64 villages with middle schools, 7 villages with secondary schools, 1 village with senior secondary school, 23 villages with no educational facility.
.*Senior secondary schools and Inter Colleges both offers 11th and 12th standard education in Jharkhand

Healthcare
Fatehpur CD block had 1 village with community health centre, 3 villages with primary health centres, 11 villages with primary health subcentres, 1 village with maternity and child welfare centre, 2 villages with medicine shops.
.*Private medical practitioners, alternative medicine etc. not included

References

Community development blocks in Jamtara district